Judeo-Tat or Juhuri (cuhuri) is the traditional language of the Mountain Jews of the eastern Caucasus Mountains, especially Azerbaijan and Dagestan, now mainly spoken in Israel.

The language is a dialect of Persian which belongs to the southwestern group of the Iranian division of the Indo-European languages, albeit with heavy Jewish influence. The Iranic Tat language is spoken by the Muslim Tats of Azerbaijan, a group to which the Mountain Jews were mistakenly considered to belong during the era of Soviet historiography though the languages probably originated in the same region of the Persian empire. The words Juvuri and Juvuro translate as "Jewish" and "Jews".

Judeo-Tat has Semitic (Hebrew/Aramaic/Arabic) elements on all linguistic levels. Judeo-Tat has the Semitic sound “ayin/ayn” (ع/ע), whereas no neighbouring languages have it. 

Judeo-Tat is an endangered language classified as "definitely endangered" by UNESCO's Atlas of the World's Languages in Danger.

Distribution
The language is spoken by an estimated 101,000 people:
 Israel: 70,000 in 1998
 Azerbaijan: 24,000 in 1989
 Russia: 2,000 in 2010
 United States: 5,000
 Canada

Phonology

Alphabet
In the early 20th century Judeo-Tat used the Hebrew script. In the 1920s the Latin script was adapted for it; later it was written in Cyrillic. The use of the Hebrew alphabet has enjoyed renewed popularity.

Influences and etymology
Judeo-Tat is a Southwest Iranian language (as is modern Persian) and is much more closely related to modern Persian than most other Iranian languages of the Caucasus [e.g. Talysh, Ossetian, and Kurdish]. However, it also bears strong influence from other sources:

Medieval Persian: Postpositions are used predominantly in lieu of prepositions e.g. modern Persian: باز او > Judeo-Tat æ uræ-voz  "with him/her".

Arabic: like in modern Persian, a significant portion of the vocabulary is Arabic in origin. Unlike modern Persian, Judeo-Tat has almost universally retained the original pharyngeal/uvular phonemes of Arabic e.g.  "honey" (Arab. ),  "morning" (Arab. ).

Hebrew: As other Jewish dialects, the language also has many Hebrew loanwords e.g. "table" (Heb.  shulḥan),  "luck" (Heb.  mazal),  "rich" (Heb.  ʻashir). Hebrew words are typically pronounced in the tradition of other Mizrahi Jews.

Azerbaijani: Vowel harmony and many loan words

Russian: Loanwords adopted after the Russian Empire's annexation of Daghestan and Azerbaijan

Northeast Caucasian languages: e.g.  "small" (probably the same origin as the medieval Caucasian city name "Sera-chuk" mentioned by Ibn Battuta, meaning "little Sera")

Other common phonology/morphology changes from classical Persian/Arabic/Hebrew:
  > /o/, /æ/, or /u/ e.g.  "book" (Arab. ),  "road/path" (Pers.  rāh),  "sacrifice" (Arab., Aramaic  or Heb.  Korban)
 /o/ > /u/ e.g.  "Absalom" (Heb.  Abshalom)
 /u/ > /y/, especially under the influence of vowel harmony
 Stress on final syllable words
 Dropping of the final /n/, e.g. /soχtæ/ "to make" (Pers.  sākhtan)

Dialects
Being a variety of the Tat language, Judeo-Tat itself can be divided into several dialects:
Quba dialect (traditionally spoken in Quba and Qırmızı Qəsəbə).
Derbent dialect (traditionally spoken in the town of Derbent and the surrounding villages).
Kaitag dialect (spoken in the North Caucasus).
The dialects of Oğuz (formerly Vartashen) and the now extinct Jewish community of Mücü have not been studied well and thus cannot be classified.

See also
Bukharian (Judeo-Tajik dialect)

References

Further reading

External links

Judeo-Tat literature
Горско-еврейский язык (словарь, грамматика, библиотека)
JUHURO.RU - Информационно развлекательный портал горских евреев Горские Евреи Израиля population ~70,000
Горские Евреи Нальчика Mountain Jews of Nalchik.
Горские Евреи Америки Mountain Jews of the US.
Сайт Горских Евреев Культура новости
Encyclopedia of Jews in the Islamic World: "Juhūrī (Judeo-Tat or Judeo-Tātī)", p 16 sq, print: Brill, Leiden 2010

 
Judeo-Persian languages
Languages of the Caucasus
Endangered Iranian languages
Languages of Azerbaijan
Languages of Russia

Persian language